Alsace Grand Cru is an Appellation d'Origine Contrôlée for wines made in specific parcels of the Alsace wine region of France. The Grand Cru AOC was recognized in 1975 by the INAO with subsequent expansion in 1983, 1992 and 2007.

The wines come from selected sites in the Alsace AOC region, located at altitudes between 200 m and 300 m. To qualify for Grand Cru status, a wine must first meet the Alsace AOC rules and then other strict requirements. For example, the yield of the vineyards has to be 55 hectoliters per hectare or less, the wine has to come from a single named vineyard (called a lieu-dit in Alsace) of Grand Cru status, and the name of the vineyard must be on the label.

As of 2018, 51 lieux-dits are listed as Grand Cru, the latest addition being Kaefferkopf of Ammerschwihr in January 2007.

History

Middle Age
In Alsace, the concept of cru vineyards came very early.

In 613, the king-to-be Dagobert gave vines on the Steinklotz to the abbey of Haslach.

In Rouffach in 762, Heddo, Archbishop of Strasbourg, founded the abbey of Ettenheim and made his income from the vines of the Vorbourg.

In Bennwihr in 777, the missi dominici passing through Alsace reported favorably to Charlemagne on the quality of Beno Villare ("Beno's domain") wines from the Marckrain.

In Sigolsheim, a charter of 783 notified that the Sigoltesberg vineyard (the current Mambourg) was the common property of the nearby lords and monasteries.

In Kintzheim in the 9th century, the Benedictine abbots of Ebersmunster owned vines on the Praelatenberg ("Prelates hill"). This lieu-dit has been farmed since 823.

In Dahlenheim and Scharrachbergheim, a charter declared a high quality vineyard of the Engelberg in 884.

In Wintzenheim in the 9th century, a gift from the abbey of Murbach cited the Hengst vineyard for the first time. The lords of Hohlandsbourg and the bailiff of Kayserberg shared its feudal rights until the French Revolution.

Between 1000 and the Renaissance, other Alsatian lieux-dits have been owned by the nobility or the clergy. The wealth of the Alsatian charter-binders formed the historical basis for the delimitation of the Alsace Grands Crus lieux-dits.

Contemporary
The Alsace wine region is distinct from other French wine regions.

After the 1919 Treaty of Versailles and the return of Alsace into France, German law in this previous Reichsland was largely retained as local law. This situation held up the recognition of Alsace wines.

A 1945 local ordinance designating the origin of Alsatian wines was used as the basis for the 1962 decree establishing the Alsace AOC. Neither the ordinance nor the decree contained a word about geographical designations or an allusion to crus.

The situation began to evolve with a decree in 1975 which created the designation "Alsace Grand Cru". Its first article makes clear that wines have first to meet the Alsace AOC rules. Then, a decree in 1983 designated an additional 25 lieux-dits.

In 1985, the INAO agreed to an increase in the Alsace Grands Crus list. The same year, a decree added 25 new names.

In 1984, the Vendange Tardive and Sélection de Grains Nobles designations were introduced. In 1993, Rouffach was admitted in the Vorbourg lieu-dit.  In 2001, the maximal yield was reduced.  In 2005, exceptions to vine planting were allowed.  The most recent additions were in 2007, bringing the total to 51 grand cru vineyards.

Geography
Alsace grands crus are produced in north-eastern France, in the region Alsace, on the territory of 47 communes (14 in Bas-Rhin and 33 in Haut-Rhin), from Marlenheim at northern end, westward from Strasbourg, to Thann at southern end, westward from Mulhouse.

Geology and orography 
The Alsace plain occupies the south part of the Upper Rhine Plain, which formed from a collapse during the Oligocene and is followed since the Miocene by the river Rhine. The vineyard stays on the lower slopes of the Vosges Mountains, on the fault zone of the graben, covered by alluvial fans of the many rivers and creeks flowing from the nearby heights. This explains the variety of the subsurface materials and their succession forming a true mosaic: limestone, granite, shale, gneiss or sandstone.

Mainly, the upper part of the slopes of the sub-Vosge hills consists of old rocks: pluton and metamorphic rocks like granite, gneiss or slate. Vine-planted parcels are rather steep and climb up to 478 m height (near Osenbach).
The lower part of the slopes consists of layers of limestone or marl covered by loess where the slope is rather smooth.

The plain consists of a thick layer of alluvium deposited by the Rhine (silt and gravel). This zone is more fertile than the others, with an important aquifer close to the surface (less than 5 m deep): the Upper Rhine aquifer.

Such differences allow each Grand Cru to benefit from a particular terroir, even more differentiated by the climate.

Climatology 

On the western side, the Vosges Mountains shield the Alsatian vineyards from wind and rain. Predominately western winds lose their moisture on the eastern side of the Vosges and arrive as Foehn winds into the Alsace plain. The precipitation mean in Alsace is the least of all French wine regions.  Colmar is one of the driest cities in France.

Consequently, the climate is more temperate than expected at this latitude: the annual mean temperature is about 1.5 °C higher. The climate is semi-continental and dry with hot springs, sunny and dry summers, long autumns and cold winters.

Each of the Grands Crus benefits from a microclimate, inevitably different from place to place.

Allowed varieties
As of 2011, Alsace Grand Cru wines can only be produced using one of four white grape varieties: Riesling, Muscat, Pinot gris and Gewürztraminer. In 2006, Zotzenberg became the only Grand Cru vineyard that could produce wine from Sylvaner. Except for certain vineyards where blends are allowed, the wines must be exclusively made using a single variety and may be labelled as such.  Late harvest wines must be labelled by grape variety.  For Muscat-labelled wines, only one of the allowed Muscat varieties can be used (see table below).

Vineyards where blends are allowed
In some Grand Cru vineyards, blends are allowed, which may also include some non-noble grapes. In Alsace, blends have usually been associated with wines of lesser quality. The producer primarily associated with high-quality blends is Marcel Deiss.

List of Alsace Grands Crus
Grand Cru vineyards (lieux-dits) with their commune(s)/village(s), département, size and the date it was granted Grand Cru status. Where the same name is used for several vineyards, its official name is "vineyard" de "village", such as Altenberg de Bergbieten, Altenberg de Bergheim or Altenberg de Wolxheim.

See also
Alsace wine regions
Alsace wine

References

External links
Alsace Grand Cru on the Official Alsace wines site , linking to PDF-documents on each Grand Cru, retrieved 2011-04-22.
The Grand Cru system of Alsace and Sortable list of Alsace Grand Cru on alsace-wine.net , retrieved 2011-04-22.

Alsace wine AOCs